Sarmen, pseudonym of Armenak Sarkisyan (born  in Pahvants village, Western Armenia, died February 18, 1984, in Yerevan) was a Soviet Armenian poet.

He wrote the lyrics to the Anthem of the Armenian Soviet Socialist Republic which remained in use from 1944 to 1991 in the Armenian SSR.

Armenians from the Ottoman Empire
20th-century Armenian poets
1901 births
1984 deaths
Armenian male poets
20th-century male writers
Emigrants from the Ottoman Empire to the Russian Empire